The 1944 United States presidential election in West Virginia took place on November 7, 1944, as part of the 1944 United States presidential election. West Virginia voters chose eight representatives, or electors, to the Electoral College, who voted for president and vice president.

West Virginia was won by President Franklin D. Roosevelt (D–New York), running with Senator Harry S. Truman, with 54.89 percent of the popular vote, against the 41st Governor of New York Thomas E. Dewey (R–New York), running with the 54th Governor of Ohio, John W. Bricker, with 45.11 percent of the popular vote. This would be the last election until 2004 when West Virginia voted to the right of neighboring Virginia, and the last until 2016 when West Virginia voted to the right of Utah.

Results

Results by county

References

West Virginia
1944
1944 West Virginia elections